Erhard Karkoschka (March 6, 1923 – June 26, 2009), was a German composer, scholar and conductor. Karkoschka was born in the German linguistic enclave of Moravská Ostrava, Czechoslovakia, and subsequent to World War II became a violinist for the Bayreuth Symphony Orchestra, leading to studies in composition, musicology and conducting at the Musikhochschule in Stuttgart and the University of Tübingen, Germany. His doctoral thesis was an analysis of the compositional techniques in the early works of Anton Webern.

From 1948 until 1968, he directed the choir and orchestra at the University of Hohenheim, the former Agricultural College, and the "Hohenheimer Schloßkonzerte". In 1958, he taught at the State University of Music and Performing Arts in Stuttgart (Staatlichen Hochschule für Musik und Darstellende Kunst Stuttgart). Then in 
1962, he founded his Ensemble for New Musik, which eventually broke away from the school in 1976 and was renamed the Contac-Ensemble. In 1973, he became the director of the Studio for Electronic Music in the Stuttgart Hochschule until his retirement in 1987.

Erhard Karkoschka wrote a book on musical notation, published in German, English and Japanese; "Das Schriftbild der neuen Musik", 1965. {English trans.: "Notation in New Music", London/New York 1972; Japanese: ZEN-ON Music Company Ltd., Tokyo 1978; Chinese translation 1999}. The extent of his compositions includes works for orchestra, chamber music and scenic music for various instruments, organ works, works for electronic instruments, cantatas, motets, psalms and songs, as well as "instructions" for group improvisation, and "music for musicians and audience". He died in Stuttgart in 2009.

Works 
Symphonic Evolution of two personal themes (1953)
God is a King! for mixed voices for words from the 47th, 4 and 74 Psalm (1954)
Symphonia Choralis on "Veni Sancte Spiritus" (1957)
Small Concerto for Violin and Chamber Orchestra (1965)
Four stages (1965)
Triptychon about B-A-C-H [organ] (1966)
Variations for anything original theme and out of (1974)
Musical fountain, multimedia project (1975)
Teleologies (1978)
Allklang (1978)
Unfolding (1982/83)
Chamber Music for Orchestra (1983)
From death. From the rebirth, based on texts by Martin Luther (1983)
Wind Poem (1987)
Sound time spectacle after one of Skriptogramm from Kurt Leonhard (1988)
Orpheus choirs for the metamorphoses of Publius Ovidius Naso (1989)
Orpheus? Or Hades height, chamber opera (1990–92)
Heading-between two Schubert Ländler (1994)N quarto: Papafrebe (1995)Celan Variations I-V, poems by Paul Celan (1996–98)Sound woodcut time in three scenes on poems by Günter Sopper (2004)

 Writings Notation of New Music, Moeckverlag Celle 1965 (Universal Edition London 1972)Analysis of new music, Döring Publisher Herrenberg 1976New Music - Listening - Understanding, Döring Publisher Herrenberg 1978Essay on Webern's use of the guitar in his Opera 10, 18 and 19'' Nova Giulianiad, Volume 3/Nr. 11-12/88

Notes

External links 
 The Erhard Karkoschka Home Page
 Erhard Karkoschka in German Wikipedia
 Aspects to Group Improvisation
 Notation in New Music

1923 births
2009 deaths
German composers
German male conductors (music)
University of Tübingen alumni
Naturalized citizens of Germany
Musicians from Ostrava
20th-century German musicologists
20th-century German conductors (music)
20th-century German male musicians
Moravian-German people